Orientalosuchina is an extinct clade of alligatoroid crocodylians from South and East Asia that lived during the Paleocene and Eocene.

The clade was named as the result of a 2019 study by Massonne et al. that included several extinct alligatoroid taxa from Asia and found that they were all closely related and together formed a monophyletic clade as basal members of Alligatoroidea, as shown in the cladogram below:

Some studies have disputed this placement of Jiangxisuchus within Orientalosuchina as an alligatoroid, instead recovering Jiangxisuchus as a basal member of Crocodyloidea.

References

Crocodilians
Paleocene reptiles of Asia
Paleocene crocodylomorphs